The 2012 European Track Championships are the European Championships for track cycling. The junior and under 23 riders events took place at the Velódromo Nacional de Sangalhos in Anadia, Portugal from 4 to 9 July 2012 .

Medal summary

Under 23

Junior

Medal table

References

European Track Championships, 2012
under-23